Redondoviruses (members of the Redondoviridae) are a family of human-associated DNA viruses. Their name derives from the inferred circular structure of the viral genome (“” means round in Spanish). Redondoviruses have been identified in DNA sequence based surveys of samples from humans, primarily samples from the oral cavity and upper airway.

Virology

Taxonomy 
Redondoviruses are assigned to a new family by the International Committee on Taxonomy of Viruses (ICTV), the Redondoviridae.

Classification 
The family Redondoviridae is divided into two species, Brisavirus and Vientovirus. The names derive from the words for breeze and wind in Spanish (“” and “”), denoting the association with the human airway. Multiple strains have been proposed on the basis of viral genome structure.

The redondoviruses are members of the Circular Rep-Containing Single Stranded (CRESS) DNA Virus group.
  Phylum: Cressdnaviricota
  Class: Arfiviricetes (Ar from arginine; fi from finger; describes a feature of the Rep protein conserved among viruses in this class)
  Order: Recrevirales (Re from redondoviruses; cre from CRESS)

Genome 
The redondovirus genome is circular, and by analogy to other CRESS viruses likely single stranded. Genomes range in size from about 3.0 to 3.1 kilobases. The genome encodes three inferred proteins:
 A Rep protein that likely initiates rolling-circle DNA replication.
 A Cap protein that likely self-assembles to yield icosahedral particles.
 An ORF3 protein of unknown function. ORF3 is entirely encoded within the Cap coding region in a different reading frame.

Epidemiology

Distribution 
Redondovirus genomes have been reported primarily from human samples surveyed using metagenomic DNA sequencing. They have been found primarily in oral and airway specimens.

Disease associations 
It is unknown whether redondoviruses cause human disease. Some CRESS viruses are known pathogens, such as porcine circovirus type 2

Redondoviruses have been reported associated with periodontitis. In one study, the levels fell with successful treatment. Abundance of redondovirus genomes has also been found to be high in some intensive care unit patients. At present the basis of these disease associations is unclear.

References

External links

 ICTV Report: Redondoviridae

DNA viruses
Virus families